The Fugard Theatre, also known as The Fugard, was opened in the District Six area of Cape Town, South Africa in February 2010. The Fugard Theatre, as an artistic producing and receiving house, closed permanently in March 2021. After commissioning and underwriting the construction of the theatre in 2009 and 10 years of philanthropic support and producing involvement, the founding producer of the Fugard, Eric Abraham, returned the building that housed the Fugard Theatre complex to its freehold owner, The District 6 Museum. The building was handed back with two fully equipped auditoria – the Main Theatre and The Sigrid Rausing Studio – in the hope that it will be able to be used for the financial benefit of the Museum and the memory of District Six and its community.

History
Following the Laurence Olivier Award-winning revival of The Magic Flute starring South African performers of Mark Dornford-May's Isango Portobello, Eric Abraham wanted to create a space in Cape Town to house South African talent. Abraham underwrote the construction of the theatre, naming it after Athol Fugard. Developed with Dornford-May and Mannie Manim, Rennie Scurr Adendorff began renovating the National Heritage listed neo-Gothic Congregational Church Hall and two former warehouses, including the Sacks Futeran building, in September 2009.

Politicians such as Kgalema Motlanthe and Trevor Manuel as well as actors such as Alan Rickman and Janet Suzman attended the grand opening in February 2010. Fugard himself premiered his play The Train Driver at the Fugard in March 2010. The Fugard became a venue that hosted plays, musicals, operas, and cinema and book events such as film premieres and the Open Book Festival.

Abraham, with Daniel Galloway as the Managing Director & Producer (December 2010 to January 2020), ran the Fugard as a philanthropic endeavor. After announcing a temporary closure, owing to the Covid-19 Pandemic, in March 2020, the theatre offered online streaming performances overseen by then newly appointed General Manager Lamees Albertus and Artistic Director, Greg Karvellas. However, the financial losses became too great, and there was little confidence it would be safe enough to reopen soon. Abraham announced in March 2021 that the theatre would be closing and the building would be handed back to the District Six Museum Board, whom Abraham hoped would find use out of the space. 

Since its physical closure, the Fugard Theatre website has been changed into an online archive which lays out the full history of the Fugard Theatre including a full listing of all past productions as well as a video series detailing the journey of the theatre. The archive intends to secure the memory of the space and offer the public a free-to-access, accurate historical archive of the theatre. 

"Another icon has fallen", John Kani wrote of the closure, and Lebo Mashile called it a "painful death". Many in the artistic community, the press, and the EFF called on Minister of Arts and Culture Nathi Mthethwa to do more to support the sector. Board Chair Siraj Desai stated a search for new tenants was underway.

References

Cape Town culture
Former churches
Former theatres
Impact of the COVID-19 pandemic on the performing arts
Theatres in South Africa
2021 disestablishments in South Africa